Caryodendron angustifolium is a species of plant in the family Euphorbiaceae.  It is native to Costa Rica, Panama, and Colombia.

References

Acalyphoideae
Flora of Panama
Flora of Costa Rica
Flora of Colombia
Data deficient plants
Plants described in 1929
Taxonomy articles created by Polbot